Prunus hortulana, called the hortulan plum and wild goose plum, is a fruit shrub in the rose family found in the central United States in: Arkansas, Iowa, Illinois, Indiana, Kansas, Kentucky, Massachusetts, Maryland, Missouri, Nebraska, Ohio, Oklahoma, Tennessee, Texas, Virginia, West Virginia. Populations east of the Appalachians probably represent naturalizations.

The leaves are green and hairless on the top, but hairy on the underside. White flowers in clusters of 2–4 appear in the spring. The edible fruits are red or yellow drupes with white dots, reportedly sweet and pleasant tasting. The species grows in upland forests and near streams.

There are several domesticated cultivars and hybrids with other Prunus.

References

External links
 
 photo of herbarium specimen at Missouri Botanical Garden, collected in Missouri in 2013, including photo showing ripe red fruits.

Plants described in 1892
Flora of the United States
hortulana
hortulana